Haliotis squamosa, common name the squamose abalone, is a species of sea snail, a marine gastropod mollusk in the family Haliotidae, the abalones.

Description
The size of the shell varies between 40 mm and 90 mm. "The shell has an oblong-ovate shape, transversely obliquely wrinkled and spirally tubularly ribbed. The tubercles are scale-like. The ribs are sometimes close, sometimes with a fine ridge running between them. The seven, open perforations are rather large. The exterior is spotted and variegated with yellow and orange-brown. The interior surface is whitish and iridescent.

This is an extremely interesting species, well characterized by its close ribs of scale-like tubercles, ranging across the shell in oblique waves. In the middle portion of the shell there is a fine ridge running between the ribs. The color is also peculiar, a kind of burnt-umberstained orange."

Distribution
This species occurs in the Indian Ocean off southern Madagascar. Gray erroneously described the species to occur off Australia.

References

 Gray, Appendix to King's Survey of the Intertropical and Western Coasts of Australia ii, p. 494, 1826.
 Geiger D.L. & Owen B. (2012) Abalone: Worldwide Haliotidae. Hackenheim: Conchbooks. viii + 361 pp. [29 February 2012] page(s): 129

External links
 

squamosa
Gastropods described in 1826